Phoenix Battye (born 28 September 1990) is an Australian rugby union player. He currently plays in the French Top 14 competition but started his professional career with the Western Force. His usual position is lock.

Off the field, Battye has a passion for the arts, with his portrait Battye Blue appearing on the National Portrait Gallery's website.

Career

In early 2012, Battye upgraded from a rookie to professional contract with the Western Force Super Rugby club. Battye made his Super Rugby debut on 3 March 2012 against the Queensland Reds.

After three seasons playing for the Western Force, Battye joined French side Béziers prior to the 2014–15 Rugby Pro D2 season.

References

External links
Western Force profile
National Portrait Gallery – Battye Blue
itsrugby.co.uk profile

1990 births
Australian rugby union players
Western Force players
Rugby union locks
Living people
Australian expatriate rugby union players
Australian expatriate sportspeople in France
Expatriate rugby union players in France
Rugby union players from New South Wales